This list is about Djurgårdens IF players with between 1 and 24 league appearances. For a list of all Djurgårdens IF players with a Wikipedia article, see :Category:Djurgårdens IF Fotboll players. For the current Djurgårdens IF first-team squad, see First-team squad.

This is a list of Djurgårdens IF players with fewer than 25 league appearances. Since playing their first competitive match, more than 400 players have made a league appearance for the club, many of whom have played between 1 and 25 matches.

Players 
Matches of current players as of before 2023 season.

Sources

References 

Players
Djurgardens IF Fotboll
Association football player non-biographical articles